Jarosław Tomasz Jagiełło (born 15 May 1971 in Łódź) is a Polish politician. He was elected to the Sejm on 25 September 2005, getting 13727 votes in 9 Łódź district as a candidate from the Law and Justice list. On 28 July 2014 he became a member of Congress of the New Right.

See also
Members of Polish Sejm 2005-2007

References

External links
Jarosław Jagiełło - parliamentary page - includes declarations of interest, voting record, and transcripts of speeches.

1971 births
Living people
Politicians from Łódź
Members of the Polish Sejm 2005–2007
Law and Justice politicians
Councillors in Łódź
Members of the Polish Sejm 2007–2011
Members of the Polish Sejm 2011–2015